Spacecraft operating in the inner Solar System usually rely on the use of power electronics-managed photovoltaic solar panels to derive electricity from sunlight. Outside the orbit of Jupiter, solar radiation is too weak to produce sufficient power within current solar technology and spacecraft mass limitations, so radioisotope thermoelectric generators (RTGs) are instead used as a power source.

History 
The first practical silicon-based solar cells were introduced by Bell Labs in April 1954. They were initially about 6% efficient, but improvements began to raise this number almost immediately. Bell had been interested in the idea as a system to provide power at remote telephone repeater stations, but the cost of the devices was far too high to be practical in this role. Aside from small experimental kits and uses, the cells remained largely unused.

This changed with the development of the first US spacecraft, the Vanguard 1 satellite. Calculations by Dr. Hans Ziegler demonstrated that a system using solar cells recharging a battery pack would provide the required power in a much lighter overall package than using just a battery. The satellite was powered by silicon solar cells with ≈10% conversion efficiency.

The success of the Vanguard system inspired Spectrolab, an optics company, to take up the development of solar cells specifically designed for space applications. They had their first major design win on Pioneer 1 in 1958, and would later be the first cells to travel to the Moon, on the Apollo 11 mission's ALSEP package. As satellites grew in size and power, Spectrolab began looking for ways to introduce much more powerful cells. This led them to pioneer the development of multi-junction cells that increased efficiency from around 12% for their 1970s silicon cells to about 30% for their current gallium arsenide (GaAs) cells. These types of cells are now used almost universally on all solar-powered spacecraft.

Uses 

Solar panels on spacecraft supply power for two main uses:

 Power to run the sensors, active heating, cooling and telemetry.
 Power for electrically powered spacecraft propulsion, sometimes called electric propulsion or solar-electric propulsion.

For both uses, a key figure of merit of the solar panels is the specific power (watts generated divided by solar array mass), which indicates on a relative basis how much power one array will generate for a given launch mass relative to another.  Another key metric is stowed packing efficiency (deployed watts produced divided by stowed volume), which indicates how easily the array will fit into a launch vehicle.  Yet another key metric is cost (dollars per watt).

To increase the specific power, typical solar panels on spacecraft use close-packed solar cell rectangles that cover nearly 100% of the Sun-visible area of the solar panels,
rather than the solar wafer circles which, even though close-packed, cover about 90% of the Sun-visible area of typical solar panels on Earth. However, some solar panels on spacecraft have solar cells that cover only 30% of the Sun-visible area.

Implementation 

Solar panels need to have a lot of surface area that can be pointed towards the Sun as the spacecraft moves. More exposed surface area means more electricity can be converted from light energy from the Sun. Since spacecraft have to be small, this limits the amount of power that can be produced.

All electrical circuits generate waste heat; in addition, solar arrays act as optical and thermal as well as electrical collectors. Heat must be radiated from their surfaces.  High-power spacecraft may have solar arrays that compete with the active payload itself for thermal dissipation. The innermost panel of arrays may be "blank" to reduce the overlap of views to space.  Such spacecraft include the higher-power communications satellites (e.g., later-generation TDRS) and Venus Express, not high-powered but closer to the Sun.

Spacecraft are built so that the solar panels can be pivoted as the spacecraft moves. Thus, they can always stay in the direct path of the light rays no matter how the spacecraft is pointed. Spacecraft are usually designed with solar panels that can always be pointed at the Sun, even as the rest of the body of the spacecraft moves around, much as a tank turret can be aimed independently of where the tank is going. A tracking mechanism is often incorporated into the solar arrays to keep the array pointed towards the sun.

Sometimes, satellite operators purposefully orient the solar panels to "off point," or out of direct alignment from the Sun. This happens if the batteries are completely charged and the amount of electricity needed is lower than the amount of electricity made; off-pointing is also sometimes used on the International Space Station for orbital drag reduction.

Ionizing radiation issues and mitigation 

Space contains varying levels of great electromagnetic radiation as well as ionizing radiation. There are 4 sources of radiations: the Earth's radiation belts (also called Van Allen belts), galactic cosmic rays (GCR), solar wind and solar flares. The Van Allen belts and the solar wind contain mostly protons and electrons, while GCR are in majority very high energy protons, alpha particles and heavier ions. Solar panels will experience efficiency degradation over time as a result of these types of radiation, but the degradation rate will depend strongly on the solar cell technology and on the location of the spacecraft. With borosilicate glass panel coverings, this may be between 5-10% efficiency loss per year. Other glass coverings, such as fused silica and lead glasses, may reduce this efficiency loss to less than 1% per year. The degradation rate is a function of the differential flux spectrum and the total ionizing dose.

Types of solar cells typically used 

Up until the early 1990s, solar arrays used in space primarily used crystalline silicon solar cells. Since the early 1990s, Gallium arsenide-based solar cells became favored over silicon because they have a higher efficiency and degrade more slowly than silicon in the space radiation environment. The most efficient solar cells currently in production are now multi-junction photovoltaic cells. These use a combination of several layers of indium gallium phosphide, gallium arsenide and germanium to harvest more energy from the solar spectrum. Leading edge multi-junction cells are capable of exceeding 39.2% under non-concentrated AM1.5G illumination and 47.1% using concentrated AM1.5G illumination.

Spacecraft that have used solar power 

To date, solar power, other than for propulsion, has been practical for spacecraft operating no farther from the Sun than the orbit of Jupiter. For example, Juno, Magellan, Mars Global Surveyor, and Mars Observer used solar power as does the Earth-orbiting, Hubble Space Telescope. The Rosetta space probe, launched 2 March 2004, used its  of solar panels as far as the orbit of Jupiter (5.25 AU); previously the furthest use was the Stardust spacecraft at 2 AU. Solar power for propulsion was also used on the European lunar mission SMART-1 with a Hall effect thruster.

The Juno mission, launched in 2011, is the first mission to Jupiter (arrived at Jupiter on July 4, 2016) to use solar panels instead of the traditional RTGs that are used by previous outer Solar System missions, making it the furthest spacecraft to use solar panels to date. It has  of panels.

The InSight lander, Ingenuity helicopter, Tianwen-1 orbiter, and Zhurong rover all currently operating on Mars also utilize solar panels.

Another spacecraft of interest was Dawn which went into orbit around 4 Vesta in 2011. It used ion thrusters to get to Ceres.

The potential for solar powered spacecraft beyond Jupiter has been studied.

The International Space Station also uses solar arrays to power everything on the station. There are four sets of solar arrays that power the station and the fourth set of arrays were installed in March 2009. 240 kilowatts of electricity can be generated from these solar arrays. That comes to 120 kilowatts average system power, including 50% ISS time in Earth's shadow.

Future uses 
For future missions, it is desirable to reduce solar array mass, and to increase the power generated per unit area. This will reduce overall spacecraft mass, and may make the operation of solar-powered spacecraft feasible at larger distances from the sun. Solar array mass could be reduced with thin-film photovoltaic cells, flexible blanket substrates, and composite support structures. Solar array efficiency could be improved by using new photovoltaic cell materials and solar concentrators that intensify the incident sunlight. Photovoltaic concentrator solar arrays for primary spacecraft power are devices which intensify the sunlight on the photovoltaics. This design uses a flat lens, called a Fresnel lens, which takes a large area of sunlight and concentrates it onto a smaller spot, allowing a smaller area of solar cell to be used.

Solar concentrators put one of these lenses over every solar cell. This focuses light from the large concentrator area down to the smaller cell area. This allows the quantity of expensive solar cells to be reduced by the amount of concentration. Concentrators work best when there is a single source of light and the concentrator can be pointed right at it. This is ideal in space, where the Sun is a single light source. Solar cells are the most expensive part of solar arrays, and arrays are often a very expensive part of the spacecraft. This technology may allow costs to be cut significantly due to the utilization of less material.

Gallery

See also 

 For solar arrays on the International Space Station, see ISS Solar Arrays or Electrical system of the International Space Station
 Ingenuity Mars 2020 helicopter runs on batteries powered by solar panels
 Nuclear power in space
 Photovoltaic system
 Solar cell
 Space-based solar power

References 

Spacecraft components
Solar power
Photovoltaics
Solar power and space